The following is a list of current Canadian Football League (CFL) team staffs:

East Division

Hamilton Tiger-Cats

Montreal Alouettes

Ottawa Redblacks

Toronto Argonauts

West Division

BC Lions

Calgary Stampeders

Edmonton Elks

Saskatchewan Roughriders

Winnipeg Blue Bombers

References

Canadian Football League coaches
Canadian Football League lists